Broadcasting Girl (Chinese: 我的播音系女友) is a 2014 Chinese romantic comedy film directed by Cheng Zhonghao and Wang Kai.

Cast
Jiro Wang
Qi Wei
Angela Qiu
Jiang Xueming

Reception
The film has grossed US$1.80 million at the Chinese box office.

References

2014 romantic comedy films
Chinese romantic comedy films